Selkirk High School is a high school in Selkirk, Scotland, which serves the town and its surrounding area including the Ettrick and Yarrow valleys and the villages of Midlem and Lilliesleaf. The school's motto is 'Trusty and Leal', taken from the common riding song 'Up wi' the Souters'.

Notable former pupils

Notable former pupils include:
Mungo Park (10 September 1771 – 1806), explorer of the African continent
Gideon Lang - Australian pastoralist and parliamentarian
Bobby Johnstone (1921 – 2001), Scotland international footballer and a member of the Hibernian legendary Famous Five forward line
Sandy McMahon (1871 – 1916), Scotland international footballer and Celtic's eighth all-time top goal scorer.
Andrew Lang (31 March 1844 – 20 July 1912), poet, novelist, literary critic and contributor to anthropology
James Marr Brydone, (1779 – 1866), surgeon who sighted the French fleet, signalling the beginning of the Battle of Trafalgar
James Brown (J.B. Selkirk) (1832–1904), poet and essayist
Peter Blake b.8 December 1951, film and television actor
Rae Hendrie b.1977, television actress
Tom Scott, artist
Dennis Soga (1917–2003), cricketer
John Rutherford b.1955 Scotland International rugby player and British and Irish Lion. He won 42 caps at fly-half for his country, at the time a record in that position.
Frightened Rabbit Indie rock band.
Jim Hume b.1962, Politician, Member of The Scottish Parliament (MSP) for South Scotland, 2007–2016.
John Greive (1886-1971), cricketer and president of the Scottish Cricket Union.
Walter Greive (1891–1917), cricketer
William Greive (1888–1916), cricketer

References

Secondary schools in the Scottish Borders
1897 establishments in Scotland
Educational institutions established in 1897
Selkirk, Scottish Borders